Johann Winter von Andernach (born Johann Winter; 1505 – 4 October 1574) was a German Renaissance physician, university professor, humanist, translator of ancient, mostly medical works, and writer of his own medical, philological and humanities works.

Life 

The family and youth of  Winter von Andernach are not well known. He probably came from a poor family and attended the town school in Andernach, then part of the Electorate of Cologne. He left his hometown in 1517  as a teenager. He had a sharp mind, was very curious and was always looking to increase his knowledge. He later moved to Utrecht, where he studied Ancient Greek. There he met  who was a teacher at Utrecht's Hieronymus school. He also met John III, Duke of Cleves, who will later become his patron.

He worked at the University of Paris and the Schola Argentoratensis.

He died, aged about 69, in Strassburg.

Name 
Johann Winter (Johannes Winther) von Andernach, so called because he was born in Andernach, experienced many variations of his name throughout his life. When the name "Winter" was translated into Italian and Latin, the "W" was replaced by "Gue" or the "Wi" replaced by "Gui," giving rise to the name "Guenther" and all of its derivatives. Since "Guenther" or "Gunter" was and is a well known German name, it was considered his real name. Thus Johann Winter is known by the following names:

 in Germany: Johann Winter, Johann Winter von Andernach, Johannes Winther (von Andernach), Johann Gwynther von Andernach 
 in France: Gonthier d’Andernach, Jehan Guinter d’Andernach
 in Italy: Ioannes Guinterius Andernacus, Guenter Andernacus
 in Latin: Ioannes Guint(h)erius Andernacus

Other variations are "Johann Guenther von Andernach", "Johann Günther of Andernach", "Johann Guinterus (Guintherius) von Andernach ". In addition, he also had a kind of pen name: Ionas Philologus, "Johann the philologist."

Works 
 Syntaxis Graeca. Paris, 1527 (Greek syntax).
 Galen's Works translated into Latin
 De anatomicis administrationibus.  9 vols, Paris, 1531.
 De Hippocratis et Platonis placitis.  Paris, 1534. 
 Anatomicarum institutionum, secundum Galeni sententiam. 4 vols, Paris and Basel, 1536; Venice, 1538; Padua, 1558.
 Clavdii Galeni Pergameni Medicorvm Omnivm Ferè principis opera, nunc demum a clarissimis et eruditis viris latinitate donata, iam vero ordine justo, et studio exquisito re in lucem recens edita. Quibus, ut solidae veraeque medicinae, non poenitendam operam olim indulsisse iuvabit. Basel, Cratander (Andreas Leennius) 1529; 27 Galen texts into Latin by 9 different translators including Johann Winter as "Ionas Phil."
 Opus de re medica 7 vols. (Medical works of Paul of Aegina), Paris, 1532; translated from the Greek into Latin.
 Institutiones anatomicae. Paris, 1536, 4 vols, standard work for physicians 
 Alexander of Tralles's Works. Strasbourg 1549 and 1556; translated into Latin
 De victus ed medicinae ratione cum alio tum pestilentiae tempore observanda commentarius. Strasbourg 1542; composed under the direction of the Strasbourg city council, French by Antoine Pierre 1544, of Winter 1547 in the title
 Instruction très utile par laquelle un chacun se pourra maintenir en santé, tant au temps de peste, comme autre temps. Strasbourg 1544 and 1547; in German
 Sehr praktische Anweisung, durch die ein jeder sich gesund halten kann, besonders in Pestzeiten wie in anderen Zeiten. 
 Bericht, Regiment, und Ordnung wie die Pestilenz und die pestilenzialische Fieber zu erkennen und zu kurieren. Strasbourg, 1564 
 Bericht und Ordnung in disen sterbenden leuffen der Pestilentz, auf befelch eines ersamen Rahts der Statt Straßurg. Gestellet durch Johann Gwynther von Andernach. Strasbourg, Rihel, 1564.
 De pestilentia commentarius in quatuor dialogos distinctus. Strasbourg, 1565.
 De medicina veteri et nova tum cognoscenda tum faciunda commentarij duo. Basel: Ex Officina Henricpetrina, 1571.

Notes

References 
 Jacob Bernays, Zur Biographie Johann Winthers von Andernach. In Zeitschrift für die Geschichte des Oberrheins. Band 16. Stuttgart 1901, pp. 28ff.
 Franz-Josef Heyen, ed. 2000 Jahre Andernach. Geschichte einer rheinischen Stadt. Stadtverwaltung Andernach, Andernach 1988. 2nd ed., 1994. 
 Édouard Turner, Jean Guinther d’Andernach (1505 à 1574) son nom, son âge, le temps de ses études à Paris, ces titres, ses ouvrages. in Gazette hebdomadaire de médecine et de chirurgie. vol. 28, Paris 1881, pp. 425ff.

External links 
 Johann-Winter-Museum in Andernach
 Biography in Melchior Adam, Vitae Germanorum medicorum (Heidelberg,1620)
 
 Works of Winter at the Munich Digitization Center
 
 

1505 births
1574 deaths
People from Andernach
People from the Electorate of Cologne
16th-century Latin-language writers
16th-century German physicians
German anatomists
16th-century German writers
16th-century German male writers